Grid 2 is a 2013 racing video game developed and published by Codemasters for Microsoft Windows, PlayStation 3, Xbox 360. It is the second game in the Grid series. Feral Interactive released the Reloaded Edition for OS X in September 2014. The sequel, Grid Autosport, was released 24 June 2014.

Gameplay
The game includes numerous real world locations and cities such as Paris. It also includes motor vehicles spanning four decades. In addition, it includes a new handling system that developer Codemasters has dubbed 'TrueFeel', which aims to hit a sweet spot between realism and accessibility. Races do not include a first person cockpit view. The popular gamemode "Drift" was shown in a gameplay preview by Codemasters.

Drivers are given certain cars before some race modes, and can unlock others through other vehicle challenges. Car liveries can be customised by the player, using preset graphic designs adapted with colours or varying shades.

World Series Racing
World Series Racing (WSR) is a highly competitive racing event that races on various tracks on various continents around the globe. It also features a mode called "LiveRoutes" where the circuit track dynamically changes with no track map. It features race types including Race, Time Attack, Drift, Eliminator, Checkpoint, Touge, and Vehicle Challenges.

A player assumes the role of a new driver who is enlisted by Patrick Callahan, an investor, to help launch the WSR by challenging drivers of racing clubs. Winning races against drivers in established clubs in North America, Europe and Asia gains more fans for the series, and leads to drivers from those clubs agreeing to join the WSR.

Marketing
In May 2013 there was a single £125,000 special edition release of the game by Codemasters which included a BAC Mono supercar featuring a Grid themed paint job and a tour of the BAC factory.

Grid 2 also sponsored Matt Kenseth's #18 GameStop Toyota during a NASCAR Nationwide Series event at Dover International Speedway.

Reception

Grid 2 received "generally favorable reviews", according to review aggregator Metacritic.

IGN wrote positively about the game's graphics, audio, and gameplay, ultimately concluding, "A well-curated car list, a great sense of speed, and a well-thought out career mode combine in a racer that is a lot of fun to play through." Game Informer lauded the bespoke nature of the World Series Racing mode, alternate track routes, and multiplayer, and noted that it was not particularly innovative. PC Gamer wrote, "for all its top- class visuals and excellent handling, somehow the game doesn't seem to believe that just racing is interesting enough on its own," criticizing the title's threadbare story while praising the realistic AI and variety of modes. Destructoid, by contrast, was disappointed by the lack of sim gameplay, and wrote, "instead offering a stripped-down version of itself that is filled with lazy design, unfair AI opponents, special ESPN ‘live’ broadcasts that no one really asked for, and to top it all off, its bizarrely irritating narrator and loudly drunk or completely apathetic fans." Push Square thought similarly, calling the game a fun but safe racer lacking both impact and identity, in contrast to its predecessor. GameSpot praised the audio, visuals, handling, multiplayer, and event variety while taking issue with the lack of difficulty customization and the presence of occasional frame drops. GamesRadar+ liked the racer's intensity, visuals, competition variety, and amount of content, while citing minor issues such as the lack of a cockpit view, single-player car upgrades, and initially jarring handling.

References

Bibliography

External links
Grid 2 at MobyGames

2013 video games
Codemasters games
Ego (game engine) games
Feral Interactive games
Grid (series)
Multiplayer and single-player video games
PlayStation 3 games
Racing video games
Sports video games with career mode
Video game sequels
Video games set in Austria
Video games set in Miami
Video games set in Dubai
Video games set in Hong Kong
Video games set in Japan
Video games set in England
Video games set in Paris
Video games set in France
Video games set in Portugal
Video games set in Indianapolis
Video games set in Spain
Video games set in California
Video games set in Chicago
Windows games
Xbox 360 games
Video games developed in the United Kingdom